Hartville is the name of some places in the United States of America:

Hartville, Missouri
Hartville, Ohio
Hartville, Wyoming